Andreas Michailidis (born July 18, 1988) is a Greek mixed martial artist who competes in the Welterweight division. He has competed in the Ultimate Fighting Championship (UFC) and Bellator MMA.

Background
Michailidis is of Pontic Greek origin. At the age of 8, after moving from Kazakhstan to Greece, he started training, in wrestling and kickboxing at Malios Team. Continuing on with MMA and Brazilian Jiu-Jitsu training at Gracie Barra Greece where he achieved a black belt in Brazilian Jiu-Jitsu.

Mixed martial arts career

Early career
After competing in numerous national Brazilian Jiu-Jitsu championships and tournaments, several MMA fights in Greece, winning the European Fight League Championship (EFL) Light Heavyweight Title, Michailidis moved to America to train with Antonio McKee and Quinton “Rampage” Jackson, for his upcoming fight in King Of The Cage: Slugfest.

A few months later, Michailidis faced Jason Butcher at Bellator 128 on October 10, 2014. He lost the fight via TKO in the second round.

After a year of training in Kings MMA, Michailidis traveled to Russia to fight in the World Fighting Championship Akhmat 9, where he won via TKO in the first round. Few months later his next successful appearance was in the United Arab Emirates to fight at Abu Dhabi Warriors 4 against Ion Pascu, where he won via unanimous decision.

Michailidis faced Evgeny Shalomaev at Fight Nights Global 63: Alibekov vs. Khamitov on April 21, 2017. He won the bout via TKO in the first round.

He lost the bout via TKO in the third round.

Michailidis faced Marcel Fortuna at Titan FC 54 on April 26, 2019. He won the bout via spinning back kick in the first round.

Ultimate Fighting Championship
Michailidis made his UFC debut, as a short notice replacement for Vinicius Moreira, against Modestas Bukauskas at UFC on ESPN: Kattar vs. Ige on July 16, 2020. Michailidis lost the bout via TKO after he could not get up at the end of the round due to a series of elbows to the side of the head. In the process, he became the first Greek fighter based in Greece appear in the UFC, and second fighter born in Greece, after Anthony Christodoulou.

Michailidis was expected to face Antônio Arroyo at UFC Fight Night: Felder vs. dos Anjos on November 14, 2020. However, Michailidis withdrew on October 23 due to undisclosed reasons and was replaced Eryk Anders.

Michailidis faced KB Bhullar at UFC on ESPN: Reyes vs. Procházka on May 1, 2021 He won the bout via unanimous decision.

Michailidis faced promotional newcomer Alex Pereira on November 6, 2021 at UFC 268. He lost the fight via TKO early in round two after getting knocked down with a flying knee.

Michailidis faced Rinat Fakhretdinov on June 4, 2022 at UFC Fight Night 207. He lost the fight via unanimous decision.

On June 8, 2022 it was confirmed that Michailidis was no longer on the UFC roster.

Oktagon MMA

Michailidis faced Leandro Silva on March 4, 2023 at Oktagon 40 in the Oktagon Welterweight Tournament Round of 16, winning the bout via unanimous decision.

Championships and accomplishments

Mixed martial arts 
 Cage Survivor
 CS Middleweight Championship 
 European Fight League EFL
 EFL Light Heavyweight Championship

Mixed martial arts record

|-
|Win
|align=center|14–6
|Leandro Silva
|Decision (Unanimous)
|OKTAGON 40
|
|align=center|3
|align=center|5:00
|Ostrava, Czech Republic
|
|-
|Loss
|align=center|13–6
|Rinat Fakhretdinov
|Decision (unanimous)
|UFC Fight Night: Volkov vs. Rozenstruik
|
|align=center|3
|align=center|5:00
|Las Vegas, Nevada, United States
|
|-
|Loss
|align=center|13–5
|Alex Pereira
|TKO (flying knee and punches)
|UFC 268
|
|align=center|2
|align=center|0:18
|New York City, New York, United States
|
|-
| Win
| align=center| 13–4
|KB Bhullar
| Decision (unanimous)
|UFC on ESPN: Reyes vs. Procházka 
|
|align=center|3
|align=center|5:00
|Las Vegas, Nevada, United States
|
|-
| Loss
| align=center| 12–4
|Modestas Bukauskas
| TKO (elbows)
|UFC on ESPN: Kattar vs. Ige 
|
|align=center|1
|align=center|5:00
|Abu Dhabi, United Arab Emirates
|
|-
| Win
| align=center|12–3
|Arymarcel Santos
|TKO (punches)
|Global Legion FC 13
|
|align=center|1
|align=center|2:13
|Miramar, Florida, United States
|
|-
| Win
| align=center| 11–3
| Marcel Fortuna
|TKO (spinning wheel kick and punches)
|Titan FC 54
|
|align=center|1
|align=center|4:26
|Fort Lauderdale, Florida, United States
|
|-
| Win
| align=center| 10–3
|Tomáš  Bolo
| TKO (punches)
| Cage Survivor 17
| 
| align=center| 1
| align=center| 2:03
| Athens, Greece
|
|-
| Loss
| align=center|9–3
| Vladimir Mineev
|TKO (punches)
|Fight Nights Global 71: Mineev vs. Michailidis
|
|align=center| 3
|align=center| 3:11
|Moscow, Russia
|
|-
| Win
| align=center|9–2
| Evgeny Shalomaev
| TKO (punches)
|Fight Nights Global 63: Alibekov vs. Khamitov
|
| align=center|1
| align=center|2:56
|Vladivostok, Russia
|
|-
| Win
| align=center|8–2
| Borce Talevski
| TKO (punches)
|Final Fight Championship 28
|
|align=center|1
|align=center|1:25
|Athens, Greece
| 
|-
| Win
| align=center| 7–2
| Ion Pascu
| Decision (unanimous)
| Abu Dhabi Warriors 4
| 
| align=center| 3
| align=center| 5:00
| Abu Dhabi, United Arab Emirates
| 
|-
| Win
| align=center| 6–2
| Arbi Madaev
|TKO (punches)
|WFCA 9: Grozny Battle 6
|
|align=center| 1
|align=center| 2:15
|Grozny, Russia
|
|-
| Loss
| align=center| 5–2
|Jason Butcher
|TKO (punches)
|Bellator 128
|
|align=center|2
|align=center|0:28
|Thackerville, Oklahoma, United States
|
|-
| Win
| align=center|5–1
|Daniel Hernandez
|Submission (side choke)
|KOTC: Slugfest
|
|align=center|1
|align=center|3:59
|Highland, California, United States
|
|-
| Win
| align=center| 4–1
| Panagiotis Stroumpoulis
|Submission (kimura)
|rowspan=2|European Fight League 2
|rowspan=2|
|align=center|1
|align=center|2:35
|rowspan=2|Heraklion, Greece
|
|-
| Win
| align=center| 3–1
|Manolis Dimitriou
| Submission (rear-naked choke)
| align=center| 2
| align=center| 1:35
|
|-
| Win
| align=center|2–1
| Panagiotis Stroumpoulis
|Submission (kimura)
| European Fight League 1
|
| align=center|2
| align=center|1:00
|Thessaloniki, Greece
|
|-
| Loss
| align=center| 1–1
| Emil Zahariev
| TKO
|Maxfight: Warriors 13
|
| align=center|2
| align=center|3:52
|Sofia, Bulgaria
|
|-
| Win
| align=center|1–0
| Giorgos Skouloudis
| TKO (punches)
|Spartan Warriors MMA
|
|align=center|1
|align=center|1:30
|Athens, Greece
|

See also 
 List of male mixed martial artists

References

External links 
  
 

1988 births
Living people
Greek male mixed martial artists
Light heavyweight mixed martial artists
Mixed martial artists utilizing kickboxing
Mixed martial artists utilizing wrestling
Mixed martial artists utilizing Brazilian jiu-jitsu
Ultimate Fighting Championship male fighters
Sportspeople from Athens
Greek practitioners of Brazilian jiu-jitsu
People awarded a black belt in Brazilian jiu-jitsu